Clonfad is a civil parish in County Westmeath, Ireland.

Clonfad is one of 10 civil parishes in the barony of Fartullagh in the Province of Leinster. Clonfad civil parish comprises 11 townlands: Calverstown, Clonfad, Dalystown, Davidstown/Guilford, Friarstown, Meedin, Newcastle, Rathnure, Templeoran North, Templeoran South and Tyrrellspass. 
Neighbouring civil parishes are: Carrick to the north, Castlelost to the east, Newtown to the south and Castletownkindalen to the west.

References

External links
Clonfad civil parish at the IreAtlas Townland Data Base
Clonfad civil parish at townlands.ie
Clonfad civil parish at the Placenames Database of Ireland

Civil parishes of County Westmeath